German submarine U-980 was a Type VIIC U-boat of Nazi Germany's Kriegsmarine during World War II.

She was ordered on 5 June 1941, and was laid down on 10 August 1942 at Blohm & Voss, Hamburg, as yard number 180. She was launched on 15 April 1943 and commissioned under the command of Oberleutnant zur See Hermann Dahms on 27 May 1943.

Design
German Type VIIC submarines were preceded by the shorter Type VIIB submarines. U-980 had a displacement of  when at the surface and  while submerged. She had two shafts and two  propellers.

U-980 was fitted with five  torpedo tubes (four fitted at the bow and one at the stern), fourteen torpedoes or 26 TMA mines, one  SK C/35 naval gun, 220 rounds, and one twin  C/30 anti-aircraft gun. The boat had a complement of between 44 — 52 men.

Service history
On 11 June 1944, nine days out of Bergen on her first, and only war patrol, U-980 was sunk by depth charges north of the Shetland Islands, in the Norwegian Sea. U-980 was attacked by a Canadian Canso of 162 Squadron/B RCAF. All Fifty-two of her crew were lost.

References

External links

Bibliography

 
 
 

German Type VIIC submarines
U-boats commissioned in 1943
World War II submarines of Germany
Ships built in Hamburg
1943 ships
Maritime incidents in June 1944
World War II shipwrecks in the Norwegian Sea